Gaston Reginald Yoland Gingras (born February 13, 1959) is a Canadian former professional ice hockey defenceman who played one season in the World Hockey Association (WHA) and ten seasons in the National Hockey League from 1978 to 1989. He won the 1986 Stanley Cup with the Montreal Canadiens.

Career
Born and raised in Temiscaming, Quebec, Gingras did not start playing hockey until the age of seven, when he convinced his mother Alva that if his best buddy could play then he would play too, and she got the necessary equipment for both boys.

In 1974, he played for the North Bay Trappers of the Ontario Provincial Junior A Hockey League and then with the Kitchener Rangers of the Ontario Hockey League, followed by the Hamilton Fincups also of the OHL. He then joined the World Hockey Association for the 1978/79 season with the Birmingham Bulls.

Gingras spent one season in Birmingham, joining Michel Goulet, Rick Vaive, Craig Hartsburg, Rob Ramage, Pat Riggin and Keith Crowder, all of whom were underage players too young to be eligible for the NHL Draft under the rules at the time. After the 1978-79 season, the WHA merged with the NHL. Included in the merger were New England (Hartford), Quebec, Winnipeg, and Edmonton. Birmingham and Cincinnati were not brought under the auspices of the NHL and subsequently disbanded, and their underage players were all declared eligible for the upcoming draft.

In the 1979 NHL Entry Draft, Gingras was drafted by the Montreal Canadiens. Although he was not picked until the second round, and was 27th overall, he was Montreal's first pick, ahead of other players such as Mats Näslund, Guy Carbonneau and Rick Wamsley. Playing first with the Nova Scotia Voyageurs of the American Hockey League, he joined the Canadiens in the 1979–80 NHL season. Gingras played four seasons at the Montreal Forum, alongside players such as Larry Robinson, Bob Gainey, Guy Lafleur and Steve Shutt, before being traded to the Toronto Maple Leafs for 2½ seasons. Possessing a fierce slap shot, he often played 'the point' on the Habs power play.

In the middle of the 1984–85 season, he was sent by the Leafs down to the AHL where he played for the St. Catharines Saints. He was then traded to the Sherbrooke Canadiens, Montreal's farm team. During this time another highlight of Gingras career emerged. Along with other notables, such as Patrick Roy, Stéphane Richer, Brian Skrudland and Ric Nattress, they won the Calder Cup.

For the 1985–86 season, he returned to the Montreal Canadiens and was part of their Stanley Cup winning team that beat the Calgary Flames four games to one.

In the 1987–88 season, he played two games for the Canadiens before moving to the St. Louis Blues for almost two seasons. Near the end of the 1988–89 season he moved to Switzerland to play for EHC Biel followed by Hockey Club Lugano in the Italian part of Switzerland.

He then moved on to play for HC Gherdëina in Italy before returning to Canada to play for the Fredericton Canadiens where he was a player/coach until he retired. He returned to play a few games with the Chesapeake Icebreakers of the ECHL in their final season.

In his NHL career, Gingras played 476 games scored 61 goals and 174 assists for a total of 235 points while collecting 161 penalty minutes in the regular season. In the playoffs he scored 6 goals and 18 assists for 24 points in 52 games and collected 20 penalty minutes.

Personal life
Although retired, Gingras still plays with the NHL Old Timers. He runs clinics to help youth players to become better players and holds one every Sunday in Dollard-des-Ormeaux, Quebec. In 2007, he went to Salluit, Nunavik to help younger Inuit develop their hockey skills. He also trains children for the Montreal Canadiens Hockey School in the Complexe Sportif Bell in Brossard, Montreal.

Gaston Gingras is the father of Sebastien Gingras, a defenseman and member of the 2014 Union College National Division I Men's Hockey Championship Team.  He is the uncle of former figure skater Jennifer Robinson.

Career statistics

Regular season and playoffs

References

External links
 

1959 births
Living people
Birmingham Bulls players
Canadian expatriate ice hockey players in Italy
Canadian expatriate ice hockey players in Switzerland
Canadian ice hockey defencemen
Chesapeake Icebreakers players
EHC Biel players
Fredericton Canadiens players
French Quebecers
Hamilton Fincups players
HC Gardena players
HC Lugano players
Ice hockey people from Quebec
Kitchener Rangers players
Montreal Canadiens draft picks
Montreal Canadiens players
Nova Scotia Voyageurs players
People from Abitibi-Témiscamingue
St. Catharines Saints players
St. Louis Blues players
Sherbrooke Canadiens players
SCL Tigers players
Stanley Cup champions
Toronto Maple Leafs players
Canadian expatriate ice hockey players in the United States